The Kumaun Express (15315 / 15316) is an express train belonging to Indian Railways - North Eastern Railway zone that runs between Gonda Junction railway station and Mailani Junction railway station in India.

References

Express trains in India
Rail transport in Uttar Pradesh
North Eastern Railway zone
Named passenger trains of India
Transport in Gonda, Uttar Pradesh
Transport in Lakhimpur Kheri district